Lim Keun-Jae (born November 5, 1969) is a South Korean football manager. He played for FC Seoul and Pohang Steelers then known as 'LG Cheetahs' and 'Pohang Atoms'.

Club career statistics

Honours

Player
LG Cheeths
 K-League Cup Runners-up (1) : 1994

Manager
Seoul United
 K3 League Winners (1) : 2007

Individual
K-League Top Scorer : 1992

External links
 

1969 births
Living people
Association football midfielders
South Korean footballers
South Korea international footballers
FC Seoul players
Pohang Steelers players
K League 1 players